A total solar eclipse occurred on October 12, 1958. A solar eclipse occurs when the Moon passes between Earth and the Sun, thereby totally or partly obscuring the image of the Sun for a viewer on Earth. A total solar eclipse occurs when the Moon's apparent diameter is larger than the Sun's, blocking all direct sunlight, turning day into darkness. Totality occurs in a narrow path across Earth's surface, with the partial solar eclipse visible over a surrounding region thousands of kilometres wide. Totality was visible in Tokelau, Cook Islands, French Polynesia, Chile and Argentina. This solar eclipse occurred over 3 months after the final game of 1958 FIFA World Cup.

Related eclipses

Solar eclipses of 1957–1960

Saros 133

Tritos series

Metonic series

Notes

References 

1958 10 12
1958 10 12
1958 in science
October 1958 events